FK Teleoptik is a professional football club based in Zemun, Belgrade, Serbia. They compete in the Serbian League Belgrade, the third tier of the national league system.

History
Founded by the manufacturing company of the same name in 1952, the club exclusively played in the local leagues of Belgrade within the Yugoslav football league system, but without notable achievements. In the early 1990s, when the country started breaking apart, they agreed to an affiliate partnership with Partizan. One of the most significant aspects of this cooperation was the construction of the SC Partizan-Teleoptik, which was officially opened in May 1998.

In the NATO bombing-shortened 1998–99 season, the club finished second in the Serbian League Belgrade, getting promotion to the Second League of FR Yugoslavia. After easily securing league status in their debut appearance, they made an even better result in the 2000–01 season, finishing in fifth place. However, the club failed to avoid relegation in 2002, when the competition changed its format.

After seven consecutive seasons in the Serbian League Belgrade, the club finally managed to earn promotion to the Serbian First League in 2009, defeating Serbian League East runners-up Timok on penalties in the playoffs. They spent the next five seasons in the second tier of Serbian football, before being relegated in 2013–14. After winning the Serbian League Belgrade in 2017, the club was promoted back to the Serbian First League, but again suffered relegation in the 2018–19 season.

Honours
Serbian League Belgrade (Tier 3)
 2016–17, 2020–21

Seasons

Notable players
This is a list of players who have played at full international level.

  Admir Aganović
  Samir Memišević
  Ivan Čvorović
  Dramane Salou
  Darko Božović
  Andrija Delibašić
  Nikola Drinčić
  Marko Janković
  Ivan Kecojević
  Goran Vujović
  Ifeanyi Emeghara
  Stefan Aškovski
  Aleksandar Lazevski
  Predrag Ranđelović
  Perica Stančeski
  Andrés Cabrero
  Nikola Aksentijević
  Stefan Babović
  Veljko Birmančević
  Miroslav Bogosavac
  Miloš Bogunović
  Miloš Jojić
  Filip Kljajić
  Nenad Lukić
  Saša Lukić
  Nikola Milenković
  Aleksandar Mitrović
  Matija Nastasić
  Jovan Nišić
  Ivan Obradović
  Aleksandar Popović
  Ivan Radovanović
  Marko Šćepović
  Petar Škuletić
  Milan Smiljanić
  Miralem Sulejmani
  Nemanja Tomić
  Jovan Vlalukin
  Milivoje Ćirković
  Saša Ilić
  Danko Lazović
  Nemanja Rnić
  Simon Vukčević

For a list of all FK Teleoptik players with a Wikipedia article, see :Category:FK Teleoptik players.

Managerial history

References

External links
 Club page at Srbijasport

 
1952 establishments in Serbia
Association football clubs established in 1952
Football clubs in Belgrade
Football clubs in Serbia
Sport in Zemun